EDDC may refer to:

Dresden Airport (by its ICAO code)
East Devon District Council in the United Kingdom
East Dorset District Council in the United Kingdom
Enhanced Display Data Channel (E-DDC)